NA-130 Lahore-XIV is a constituency for the National Assembly of Pakistan.

Members of Parliament

2002-2018: NA-120 Lahore-III

2018-2022: NA-125 Lahore-III

Election 2002

General Elections were held on 10 October 2002. Muhammed Pervaiz Malik won this seat with 33,741 votes.

|}

Election 2008

General Elections were held on 18 February 2008. Bilal Yaseen won this seat with 65,946 votes.

Election 2013 

General elections were held on 11 May 2013. Nawaz Sharif won this seat with 91,666 votes. 

|}

By-election 2017

Following the decision given by the Supreme Court of Pakistan to disqualify Prime Minister Nawaz Sharif from public office, a bye-election was triggered in his NA-120 constituency. The by-election took place on 17 September 2017. Kulsoom Nawaz won this seat with 61,745 votes.

Detailed results can be found here.

 

|}

Election 2018 

General elections were held on 25 July 2018.

See also
NA-129 Lahore-XIII
NA-131 Kasur-I

References

External links
 Election result's official website
 ECP to hold NA-120 By-election after Nawaz Sharif Disqualification
 By-election NA-120 (Lahore-III) Result In Details

NA-120